Karl Spiehs (20 February 1931 – 27 January 2022) was an Austrian film producer. He produced more than 160 films and television shows from 1961 to 2017. He was born in Blindendorf-Dunkelstein, Neunkirchen District, Austria.

Spiehs died on 27 January 2022, at the age of 90.

Selected filmography

 Our Crazy Aunts (1961)
 Dance with Me Into the Morning (1962)
 Our Crazy Nieces (1963)
 Don't Fool with Me (1963)
 Our Crazy Aunts in the South Seas (1964)
 The Last Ride to Santa Cruz (1964)
 The World Revolves Around You (1964)
 Killer's Carnival (1966)
 Target for Killing (1966)
 Maigret and His Greatest Case (1966)
 How to Seduce a Playboy (1966)
 Blood at Sundown (1966)
 Hot Pavements of Cologne (1967)
 Always Trouble with the Teachers (1968)
 Help, I Love Twins (1969)
 Our Doctor is the Best (1969)
 When You're With Me (1970)
 When the Mad Aunts Arrive (1970)
 Aunt Trude from Buxtehude (1971)
 The Mad Aunts Strike Out (1971)
 Who Laughs Last, Laughs Best (1971)
 Rudi, Behave! (1971)
 The Reverend Turns a Blind Eye (1971)
 Bloody Friday (1972)
 Always Trouble with the Reverend (1972)
 Meine Tochter – Deine Tochter (1972)
 Cry of the Black Wolves (1972)
 Crazy – Completely Mad (1973)
 The Bloody Vultures of Alaska (1973)
 Trouble with Trixie (1973)
 Julia (1974)
 Alpine Glow in Dirndlrock (1974)
 Everyone Dies Alone (1976)
 Three Bavarians in Bangkok (1976)
 The Fruit is Ripe (1977)
 Three Swedes in Upper Bavaria (1977)
 Vanessa (1977)
 Popcorn and Ice Cream (1978)
 She's 19 and Ready (1979)
 Cola, Candy, Chocolate (1979)
 Devil Hunter (1980)
 Sadomania (1981)
 Bloody Moon (1981)
 Banana Joe (1982)
 Die Supernasen (1983)
 Sunshine Reggae in Ibiza (1983)
 Lethal Obsession (1987)
 Starke Zeiten (1988)
 Silence Like Glass (1989)
 Gummibärchen küßt man nicht (1989)
 Ein Schloß am Wörthersee (1990–1992, TV series)
 Fiorile (1993)

References

External links

1931 births
2022 deaths
Austrian film producers
People from Perg District
Recipients of the Austrian Cross of Honour for Science and Art, 1st class
Recipients of the Romy (TV award)